In number theory, Euler's totient function counts the positive integers up to a given integer  that are relatively prime to . In other words, it is the number of integers  in the range  for which the greatest common divisor  is equal to 1.

Therefore, .

This function gives the order of the multiplicative group of integers modulo  (the group of units of the ring ). It is also used for defining the RSA encryption system.

History, terminology, and notation 

Leonhard Euler introduced the function in 1763. However, he did not at that time choose any specific symbol to denote it. This definition varies from the current definition for the totient function at  but is otherwise the same. The now-standard notation  comes from Gauss's 1801 treatise Disquisitiones Arithmeticae, although Gauss didn't use parentheses around the argument and wrote . Thus, it is often called Euler's phi function or simply the phi function.

In 1879, J. J. Sylvester coined the term totient for this function, so it is also referred to as Euler's totient function, the Euler totient, or Euler's totient. Jordan's totient is a generalization of Euler's.

Computing Euler's totient function 

There are several formulae for computing .

Euler's product formula

It states

where the product is over the distinct prime numbers dividing . (For notation, see Arithmetical function.)

Phi is a multiplicative function 

This means that if , then .

Value of phi for a prime power argument 

Proof of Euler's product formula

The fundamental theorem of arithmetic states that if  there is a unique expression  where  are prime numbers and each . (The case  corresponds to the empty product.)

This gives both versions of Euler's product formula.

An alternative proof that does not require the multiplicative property instead uses the inclusion-exclusion principle applied to the set , excluding the sets of integers divisible by the prime divisors.

Example

In words: the distinct prime factors of 20 are 2 and 5; half of the twenty integers from 1 to 20 are divisible by 2, leaving ten; a fifth of those are divisible by 5, leaving eight numbers coprime to 20; these are: 1, 3, 7, 9, 11, 13, 17, 19.

The alternative formula uses only integers:

Fourier transform

The totient is the discrete Fourier transform of the gcd, evaluated at 1. Let

Then

The real part of this formula is

Divisor sum

The property established by Gauss, that

(See Arithmetical function for notational conventions.)

Equivalently, the formula can be derived by the same argument applied to the multiplicative group of the th roots of unity and the primitive th roots of unity.

The formula can also be derived from elementary arithmetic. For example, let  and consider the positive fractions up to 1 with denominator 20:

Put them into lowest terms:

These twenty fractions are all the positive  ≤ 1 whose denominators are the divisors . Similarly, there are  fractions with denominator 10, and  fractions with denominator 5, etc. Thus the set of twenty fractions is split into subsets of size  for each  dividing 20. A similar argument applies for any n.

Möbius inversion applied to the divisor sum formula gives

This formula may also be derived from the product formula by multiplying out  to get 

An example:

Some values

The first 100 values  are shown in the table and graph below:

{| class="wikitable" style="text-align: right"
|+ for 
! +
! 1 || 2 || 3 || 4 || 5 || 6 || 7 || 8 || 9 || 10
|- 
! 0 
| 1 || 1 || 2 || 2 || 4 || 2 || 6 || 4 || 6 || 4 
|-
! 10
| 10 || 4 || 12 || 6 || 8 || 8 || 16 || 6 || 18 || 8 
|- 
! 20
| 12 || 10 || 22 || 8 || 20 || 12 || 18 || 12 || 28 || 8 
|-
! 30
| 30 || 16 || 20 || 16 || 24 || 12 || 36 || 18 || 24 || 16 
|-
! 40
| 40 || 12 || 42 || 20 || 24 || 22 || 46 || 16 || 42 || 20
|-
! 50
| 32 || 24 || 52 || 18 || 40 || 24 || 36 || 28 || 58 || 16 
|-
! 60
| 60 || 30 || 36 || 32 || 48 || 20 || 66 || 32 || 44 || 24 
|-
! 70
| 70 || 24 || 72 || 36 || 40 || 36 || 60 || 24 || 78 || 32
|-
! 80
| 54 || 40 || 82 || 24 || 64 || 42 || 56 || 40 || 88 || 24
|-
! 90
| 72 || 44 || 60 || 46 || 72 || 32 || 96 || 42 || 60 || 40 
|}

In the graph at right the top line  is an upper bound valid for all  other than one, and attained if and only if  is a prime number.

Euler's theorem

The special case where  is prime is known as Fermat's little theorem.

This follows from Lagrange's theorem and the fact that  is the order of the multiplicative group of integers modulo .

The RSA cryptosystem is based on this theorem: it implies that the inverse of the function , where  is the (public) encryption exponent, is the function , where , the (private) decryption exponent, is the multiplicative inverse of  modulo . Only  is publicly disclosed, and given the difficulty to factor large numbers we have the guarantee that no one else knows the factorization.

Other formulae
In particular:
Compare this to the formula   (see least common multiple).
Moreover, if  has  distinct odd prime factors, 
 For any  and  such that  there exists an  such that .
 

 ( cited in)

 
 
 

(where  is the Euler–Mascheroni constant).

Menon's identity

In 1965 P. Kesava Menon proved

Generating functions

The Dirichlet series for  may be written in terms of the Riemann zeta function as:

The Lambert series generating function is

Growth rate

First

but as n goes to infinity, for all 

In fact, during the proof of the second formula, the inequality

We also have

Proving this does not quite require the prime number theorem. Since  goes to infinity, this formula shows that

In fact, more is true.

and

The second inequality was shown by Jean-Louis Nicolas. Ribenboim says "The method of proof is interesting, in that the inequality is shown first under the assumption that the Riemann hypothesis is true, secondly under the contrary assumption."

For the average order, we have

due to Arnold Walfisz, its proof exploiting estimates on exponential sums due to I. M. Vinogradov and N. M. Korobov. 
By a combination of van der Corput's and Vinogradov's methods, H.-Q. Liu (On Euler's function.Proc. Roy. Soc. Edinburgh Sect. A 146 (2016), no. 4, 769–775)  
improved the error term to 

(this is currently the best known estimate of this type). The "Big " stands for a quantity that is bounded by a constant times the function of  inside the parentheses (which is small compared to ).

Ratio of consecutive values

In 1950 Somayajulu proved

In 1954 Schinzel and Sierpiński strengthened this, proving that the set

is dense in the positive real numbers. They also proved that the set

is dense in the interval (0,1).

Totient numbers
The valency or multiplicity of a totient number  is the number of solutions to this equation. A nontotient is a natural number which is not a totient number. Every odd integer exceeding 1 is trivially a nontotient. There are also infinitely many even nontotients, and indeed every positive integer has a multiple which is an even nontotient.

The number of totient numbers up to a given limit  is

for a constant .

If counted accordingly to multiplicity, the number of totient numbers up to a given limit  is

where the error term  is of order at most  for any positive .

It is known that the multiplicity of  exceeds  infinitely often for any .

Ford's theorem

 proved that for every integer  there is a totient number  of multiplicity : that is, for which the equation  has exactly  solutions; this result had previously been conjectured by Wacław Sierpiński, and it had been obtained as a consequence of Schinzel's hypothesis H. Indeed, each multiplicity that occurs, does so infinitely often.

However, no number  is known with multiplicity . Carmichael's totient function conjecture is the statement that there is no such .

Perfect totient numbers

A perfect totient number is an integer that is equal to the sum of its iterated totients. That is, we apply the totient function to a number n, apply it again to the resulting totient, and so on, until the number 1 is reached, and add together the resulting sequence of numbers; if the sum equals n, then n is a perfect totient number.

Applications

Cyclotomy

In the last section of the Disquisitiones Gauss proves that a regular -gon can be constructed with straightedge and compass if  is a power of 2. The primes that are one more than a power of 2 are called Fermat primes, and only five are known: 3, 5, 17, 257, and 65537. Fermat and Gauss knew of these. Nobody has been able to prove whether there are any more.

Thus, a regular -gon has a straightedge-and-compass construction if n is a product of distinct Fermat primes and any power of 2. The first few such  are
2, 3, 4, 5, 6, 8, 10, 12, 15, 16, 17, 20, 24, 30, 32, 34, 40,... .

Prime number theorem for arithmetic progressions

The RSA cryptosystem

A message, represented by an integer , where , is encrypted by computing .

It is decrypted by computing . Euler's Theorem can be used to show that if , then .

The security of an RSA system would be compromised if the number  could be efficiently factored or if  could be efficiently computed without factoring .

Unsolved problems

Lehmer's conjecture

If  is prime, then . In 1932 D. H. Lehmer asked if there are any composite numbers  such that  divides . None are known.

In 1933 he proved that if any such  exists, it must be odd, square-free, and divisible by at least seven primes (i.e. ). In 1980 Cohen and Hagis proved that  and that .

Carmichael's conjecture

See Ford's theorem above.

As stated in the main article, if there is a single counterexample to this conjecture, there must be infinitely many counterexamples, and the smallest one has at least ten billion digits in base 10.

Riemann hypothesis

The Riemann hypothesis is true if and only if the inequality

See also 
Carmichael function
Duffin–Schaeffer conjecture
Generalizations of Fermat's little theorem
Highly composite number
Multiplicative group of integers modulo 
Ramanujan sum
Totient summatory function
Dedekind psi function

Notes

References

The Disquisitiones Arithmeticae has been translated from Latin into English and German. The German edition includes all of Gauss' papers on number theory: all the proofs of quadratic reciprocity, the determination of the sign of the Gauss sum, the investigations into biquadratic reciprocity, and unpublished notes.

References to the Disquisitiones are of the form Gauss, DA, art. nnn.

. See paragraph 24.3.2.

 Dickson, Leonard Eugene, "History Of The Theory Of Numbers", vol 1, chapter 5 "Euler's Function, Generalizations; Farey Series", Chelsea Publishing 1952
.

 

 
 

 
 
.

External links
 
Euler's Phi Function and the Chinese Remainder Theorem — proof that  is multiplicative
Euler's totient function calculator in JavaScript — up to 20 digits
Dineva, Rosica, The Euler Totient, the Möbius, and the Divisor Functions
Plytage, Loomis, Polhill Summing Up The Euler Phi Function

Modular arithmetic
Multiplicative functions
Articles containing proofs
Algebra
Number theory
Leonhard Euler